The list of ship launches in 1966 includes a chronological list of all ships launched in 1966.



References

Sources

1966
Ship launches